The Mercedes-Benz W08 was 
a large luxury car produced by Daimler-Benz.  It was introduced in Autumn 1928, as Mercedes-Benz's first eight-cylinder passenger car. Also known by various “type numbers”, it remained in production with various modifications and upgrades until the later summer of 1939, the longest lived Mercedes-Benz model of the 1920s and 1930s.

Typ Nürburg 460 1928–1929 
The W08 “Typ Nürburg 460” was developed by Ferdinand Porsche, who had transferred to Daimler  from the firm’s Austrian affiliate in 1923.  Porsche was the board member with responsibility for new product development.   The company’s objective with the first eight cylinder Mercedes-Benz was to come up with a serious competitor to the Horch 8, and Porsche’s work on the new car appears to have been very rushed.   The result was a car with a traditional “overslung” (“Hochbett”) chassis with the longitudinal chassis members directly above the axles, at a time when newer designs increasingly favored “underslung” (“Tiefbett”) chassis layouts on which the axles sat directly above the load bearing chassis beams.   The 1928 Mercedes-Benz W08 therefore looked unfashionably tall even at the time of its launch.

The wheels were suspended from rigid axles supported by semi-elliptical leaf springs at the front and at the back. Braking applied on all four wheels using a mechanical linkage supported by a Bosch-Dewandre vacuum suction device.

The car was close in size to the Horch 8 which had effectively been benchmarked for its design. Both cars had an imposing height in this standard bodied form of  even though the Horch had since its 1926 launch incorporated an “underlung” chassis.

In addition to the “Pullman-Limousine” bodied car, priced by Mercedes-Benz at 15,000 Marks, buyers of the 1928 W08 could choose a Torpedo bodied 6 seater “Tourenwagen” for 14,000 Marks or a 4-door “Cabriolet D” for 17,500 Marks.   There is also mention of a reduced wheelbase 2-door cabriolet, although it is not clear whether any of these were produced based on the 1928 W 08.

The big old fashioned and very expensive Mercedes-Benz W08 of 1928 found few customers, and had to be replaced the next year with a more stylish version, now using an “underslung” chassis.   Technical Director Porsche’s contract was not renewed at the end of 1928 which was followed by two years of acrimonious litigation between the company and its former Technical Director, while there are reports that it took six years for Mercedes-Benz to sell off, at discounted prices, the already accumulated inventory of 1928 model Nürburg 460s.

Typ Nürburg 460 1929–1932 
For 1929 the W08 was extensively reworked by the newly appointed Technical Director Hans Nibel.   The result was a car with a modern “underslung” chassis whereby the longitudinal chassis beams were located below axel height.   This made it easier for people to step into the car as well as  allowing for a range of lower and more elegant car bodies to be fitted.  The  wheelbase was unchanged, however.

The engine and most other technical details were carried over unchanged from the 1928 car including the ratios chosen for the four speed manual transmission.   Synchromesh was not included at this stage.  A newly available transmission option for 1929 was an additional “overdrive” ratio.

A shorter, if still substantial  wheelbase version was available from 1931 for two door cabriolet body work, although as far as is known Mercedes-Benz themselves offered no “standard Sindelfingen built" body of their own for this shorter chassis.   The standard bodies offered for the standard wheelbase 1929 cars covered the same possibilities as the 1928 body range.  It is clear from surviving examples that many customers preferred to buy the car in base chassis form and have a bespoke body added by an independent coachbuilder, however.

Despite the extensive makeover applied in 1929 the Mercedes-Benz W08 was still comfortably outsold by the Horch 8 which evidently was well entrenched at the top end of the German passenger car market at this time, and which in most body configurations was a little less overwhelmingly expensive than the eight cylinder contender from Mercedes-Benz.    On the other hand, with this model Mercedes were able to ensure that the market place dominance of the big Horch was no longer completely unchallenged.

A Typ Nürburg 460  was gifted to the Pope in 1930.

Typ Nürburg 500 1931–1933 
In 1931 the  wheelbase car became available with an enlarged 4,918cc engine which now also featured a twin downdraft carburettor. A wider range of standard bodies was also now listed including a six-seater “Pullman-Cabriolet F” priced at 21,800 Marks, along with two and four door “Cabriolet C” and “Cabriolet D” models.

Typ 500 (1932–1936) 
In 1932 the W08 lost the “Nürburg” name, being sold simply as the Mercedes-Benz Typ 500.   The 4,918cc  side-valve engine with its twin downdraft carburettor was unchanged, as were the four speed optional overdrive transmission, wheelbase, and list of standard body types. Styling was changed slightly, the most obvious aspect of which was a slight raking of both radiator grill and windscreen.

Despite the same stated maximum output of  engine compression ratio was slightly raised, as were transmission gear ratios and maximum torque.   With slightly larger wheels the Typ 500 could reach 120 km/h (75 mph).

Typ 500 (1936–1939) 
The cylinder capacity at 4,918cc was unchanged, but there was a marginal raising of the compression ratio. The claimed top speed was now raised further to 123 km/h (76 mph). Visually the 1936 cars can be differentiated from the increased rake of the front grill and windscreen.

By this time the rival from Horch, the Horch 8, had disappeared from the scene (in 1935) and Mercedes-Benz production of their own 8 cylinder cars had slowed to a trickle.   Between 1931 and 1935 the annual volume of passenger car sales in Germany more than tripled, but these very large cars did not share in the general auto-market expansion of the 1930s.  The W 08 remained in production till 1939, annual production volumes for 1936, 1937, 1938 and 1939 falling to 87, 54, 50 and 51 cars.   The model was discontinued in 1939 without any immediate successor, twenty-four years passing before the next 8-cylinder engined Mercedes-Benz appeared, the (Mercedes-Benz 600) in 1963.  During its final years the W 08 was the only model in the manufacturer's range still featuring rigid axles and wooden wheels.

The Mercedes-Benz W08 was never intended or expected to sell in massive volumes, and production totaled 3,824 cars during its eleven-year run between 1928 and 1939.   Its less expensive and exclusive rival, the Zwickau built Horch 8, sold approximately 12,000 cars between 1926 and 1934.

Sources and further reading
 

This entry incorporates  information from the  equivalent German Wikipedia entry.

External links

W08
W08
Rear-wheel-drive vehicles
Sedans
1920s cars
1930s cars